Rhodoneura is a genus of moths of the family Thyrididae described by Achille Guenée in 1858.

Description
Palpi straight, upturned, reaching above vertex of head. Third joint variable in length. Forewings slightly produced and acute at apex. Forewings with veins 6 to 10 given off to the angle of cell. Hindwings with vein 5 from just above lower angle of cell.

Type species
 Rhodoneura pudicula Guenée, 1858

Species
Some species of this genus are:

Rhodoneura acaciusalis (Walker, 1859)
Rhodoneura aurata (Butler, 1882)
Rhodoneura cuprea (Butler, 1882)
Rhodoneura abacha Whalley, 1971
Rhodoneura disjuncta (Gaede, 1929)
Rhodoneura disparalis Hampson, 1910
Rhodoneura elegantula Viette, 1957
Rhodoneura fallax (Warren, 1896)
Rhodoneura flavicilia Hampson, 1906
Rhodoneura intimalis (Moore, 1888)
Rhodoneura lacunosa Whalley, 1971
Rhodoneura limatula Whalley, 1967
Rhodoneura marojejy Viette, 1960
Rhodoneura mellea (Saalmüller, 1881)
Rhodoneura mescememna Dyar, 1914
Rhodoneura molecula (Dyar, 1914)
Rhodoneura multiguttata (Hampson, 1906)
Rhodoneura nitens (Butler, 1887)
Rhodoneura opalinula (Mabille, 1879)
Rhodoneura pammicra Dyar, 1914
Rhodoneura postponens (Dyar, 1914)
Rhodoneura roseola Whalley, 1971
Rhodoneura serraticornis (Warren, 1899)
Rhodoneura seyrigi (Viette, 1957)
Rhodoneura sordidula (Plötz, 1880)
Rhodoneura strix Viette, 1958
Rhodoneura superba (Viette, 1954)
Rhodoneura terreola (Mabille, 1880)
Rhodoneura translucida Viette, 1954
Rhodoneura viettealis Whalley, 1977
Rhodoneura werneburgalis (Keferstein, 1870)
Rhodoneura zophocrana Viette, 1957
Rhodoneura zurisana Whalley, 1971

References

External links
An Illustrated Guide to the Thyridid Moths of Borneo

Thyrididae
Moth genera